The political leadership of East Germany was distributed between several offices. The Socialist Unity Party of Germany (SED) and its leader held ultimate power and authority over state and government.
 
Prior to the proclamation of an East German state, the Soviets established the German Economic Commission (DWK) in 1948 as a de facto government in their occupation zone. Its chairman was Heinrich Rau.

On 7 October 1949 an East German state, called the German Democratic Republic (GDR), was proclaimed and took over governmental functions from the DWK, largely with the same leading figures.
 
Until autumn of 1989, the most important position in the GDR was that of the General Secretary of the (SED), titled as the First Secretary between 1953 and 1976. The GDR Constitution contained a section granting the SED a monopoly on power, making the General Secretary the de facto leader of the country. He and the party Politburo, which he headed, set all policy, with both cabinet and parliament acting as a rubber stamp implementing the decisions.

The formal head of state was originally the President of the German Democratic Republic. After the death of incumbent Wilhelm Pieck in 1960, the office was replaced by a collective body as head of state, the State Council. The position of chairman was commonly held by the party leader.

Government was headed by the Council of Ministers and its chairman, sometimes colloquially called Prime Minister. However, all the decisions were made by the party, with the cabinet implementing them. Indeed, the SED Central Committee had committees mirroring the cabinet departments.

Other important institutions included the People's Chamber, the legislature whose sessions were chaired by a President of the People's Chamber, and, since 1960, the National Defense Council, which held supreme command of the GDR's armed forces and had unlimited authority over the State in time of war. The Council was composed exclusively of members of the SED's Central Committee and Politburo, with the party leader serving as Chairman of the National Defense Council.

The political landscape was completely changed by the Peaceful Revolution late in 1989, which saw the SED having to relinquish its monopoly on political power and the National Defense Council and the State Council being abolished. The remaining institutions were the People's Chamber, whose President became head of state by default for the remainder of the GDR's existence, and the Council of Ministers, both now constituted on basis of the country's first and only democratic elections in March 1990. The GDR joined the Federal Republic of Germany on 3 October 1990

Leaders of the Socialist Unity Party of Germany (SED)

|-align="center"
! colspan=7| Joint Chairmen of the Socialist Unity Party

|-align="center"
! colspan=7| General Secretary of the Central Committee

|-align="center"
! colspan=7| (Honorary) Chairman of the Central Committee

On 1 December 1989, the People's Chamber removed the section of the East German Constitution granting the SED a monopoly of power—thus ending Communist rule in East Germany. Before the month was out, the SED transformed from a Leninist cadre party into a democratic socialist party, renaming itself first to Socialist Unity Party — Party of Democratic Socialism and later in the same year, to Party of Democratic Socialism (PDS). Hence, the party's subsequent leaders were no more leaders of East Germany than the leaders of other parties.

Heads of state

|-align="center"
! colspan=7| President of the Republic

|-align="center"
! colspan=7| Chairman of the State Council

|-align="center"
! colspan=7| President of the People's Chamber

Heads of government

|-align="center"
! colspan=7| Minister-President

! colspan=7| Chairman of the Council of Ministers

! colspan=7| Minister-President

Heads of parliament

|-align="center"
! colspan=7| President of the People's Chamber

Heads of the military

See also

 List of German monarchs
 President of Germany
 President of Germany (1919–1945)
 List of presidents of Germany
 Chancellor of Germany
 List of chancellors of Germany

Notes

References

External links
 World StatesmenEast Germany

Leaders
East Germany leaders
Leaders